Tasmania Football Club, commonly known as the Tasmania Devils, is an Australian rules football club based in Tasmania and is owned and run by AFL Tasmania.

The club formerly competed in the Victorian Football League in Australia. Formed in 2001, it was the youngest and the only fully non-Victorian club in the league. The club was based in the state of Tasmania at Bellerive Oval. At the end of the 2008 season, AFL Tasmania decided to withdraw the Devils from the VFL competition in favour of restarting a new Tasmanian league encompassing the entire state.

The Devils are scheduled to re-enter the VFL in 2022 and currently compete at junior level as a representative side taking over from the Tassie Mariners in 2019 in the NAB League Boys, entering an NAB League Girls and Under 16 competitions. 

There is speculation that the Devils are the likely franchise for the Tasmanian AFL bid with granting of a Tasmanian license currently being decided by the AFL Commission for proposed entry in 2025.

Club history

During the 1990s, Tasmania had shown strong interest in joining the AFL and after rejected bids in 1995 and 1997 the Australian Football League instigated the formation a Tasmanian team for the newly re-constructed Victorian Football League. The Tasmanian Devils Football Club formed in 2001 and was admitted into the VFL in its inaugural season the same year. The AFL continues to own the club.

The nickname "Devils" was chosen as the moniker for the club after the tenacious marsupial predator the Tasmanian devil which is indigenous to the island of Tasmania. The club colours green, red, gold (and black) were inspired by the original State of Origin "map" guernsey and are also Tasmania's sporting colours.

The Devils established home grounds in both Hobart and Launceston to deal with the long-standing north–south rivalry. Originally northern home games were played at Ulverstone, Devonport, Burnie and at Launceston's Aurora Stadium while North Hobart Oval hosted games in the south. At the end of the 2005 season the team moved from North Hobart Oval to Bellerive Oval for home games in the south and began playing all northern home games at Aurora Stadium.

2001 and 2002 brought mediocre results but, under the direction of coach Matthew Armstrong, the Devils made the finals for the first time in 2003, finishing a respectable third. The 2004 and 2005 seasons saw the Devils again making the finals.

At the start of the 2006 season the Devils and the Australian Football League's North Melbourne Football Club began a partial alignment, allowing North Melbourne listed players to play for Tasmania when not selected in the seniors, and arrangement which lasted from 2006 until 2007. This was unpopular among local fans, significantly harming the popularity of the club; and the season proved to be a disappointment on-field, with the Devils finishing ninth and missing the finals. During the 2006 season, Armstrong stepped down as coach due to internal pressure from the playing group, ending his six-year term as Devils coach. North Hobart premiership coach and former Devil Brendon Bolton was made stand in coach for the remainder of the year.

Tasmanian and former Sydney Swan Daryn Cresswell was named coach of the club for 2007 after a successful career as an assistant coach at Geelong and the Brisbane Lions; however, hampered in part by Cresswell's off-field issues which included a gambling addiction and eventual fraud conviction, the club finished wooden spooners both seasons he coached the team, winning only six of a total 34 games.

At the end of the 2008 season, AFL Tasmania decided to withdraw the Devils from the VFL competition in favour of restarting a new Tasmanian league encompassing the entire state.

In 2018, a provisional licence was granted to AFL Tasmania which may see the Devils, or a new Tasmanian-based VFL team, competing again in the VFL from as early as 2021.

Attendances
The Devils generated the largest crowds in the VFL; in the early stages they averaged around 4,000 per match at both North Hobart Oval in Hobart and Aurora Stadium in Launceston, but crowds fell away sharply in 2007 to approximately 1,500 at Bellerive Oval and less than 1,000 at Aurora Stadium.

Sponsors
Major Jumper Sponsors:
 Wrest Point Hotel Casino (2006–2008)
 Patrick (2001–2005)
Apparel Sponsors:
 Burley-Sekem (2001–2008)

Ball Sponsors:
 Jetstar

Alignment with AFL club
Following the trend of AFL clubs to align themselves with VFL clubs for match fitness of reserves players, in 2005 the Kangaroos expressed intentions to align with the Devils. A deal was struck that involved a capped number of players from the Kangaroos in both the Devils and the North Ballarat Football Club in the VFL.

In September 2007 AFL Tasmania announced an end to the alignment. The club took to the field in 2008 in its final season as a stand-alone club.

Coaches
2001-2006 Matthew Armstrong
2006 Brendon Bolton
2007-2008 Daryn Cresswell

VFL Club Records

Individual awards
Alastair Lynch Medalists (Best and Fairest):
 Leigh Walker (2001)
 Cameron Blight & Ben Atkin (2002)
 Jordan Doering (2003)
 Matthew Jovanovic (2004)
 Ian Callinan (2005)
 Brett Geappen (2006)
 Leigh Adams (2007)
 Cameron Thurley (2008)

JJ Liston Trophy Medallists:
 Ian Callinan (2005)

See also
 Tasmania Devils (NAB League)

References

External links

 AFL Tasmania
Full Points Footy profile for Tasmanian Devils Football Club

Former Victorian Football League clubs
Australian rules football clubs in Tasmania
2001 establishments in Australia
Australian rules football clubs established in 2001
2008 disestablishments in Australia
Australian rules football clubs disestablished in 2008
Sport in Launceston, Tasmania
Sport in Hobart